The 2006 GAA Interprovincial Championship, (also known as the Railway Cup or The Martin Donnelly Cup was a Gaelic Athletic Association competition between the four provinces of the Island of Ireland. The 2006 football final was held at Boston in the United States of America and the hurling final was played at Pearse Stadium, Galway, Ireland on October, 2006. 2006s interprovincial championship finished with Leinster claiming the Martin Donnelly cup in both hurling and Gaelic football.

Football

Leinster v Ulster
Leinster made the Boston final due to a win over Ulster at Kingspan Breffni Park. The game was refereed by P Russell from Tipperary.

Connacht v Munster
Connacht qualified for the Martin Donnelly football final in Boston following a thrilling extra-time victory over Munster at Ballyforan, Co. Roscommon on Friday, October 6, 2006. The game was refereed by  J McKee from Armagh.

Final

Results

Hurling

Leinster v Ulster
The game which was played on Saturday, October 14, 2006 was refereed by M Haverty from Galway.

Connacht v Munster
The game which was played on Sunday, October 15, 2006 was refereed by Brian Gavin from Offaly.

Final
The hurling final is to be played as a curtain raiser to the International rules football first test at Pearse Stadium, Galway on October 28.

Results

GAA Interprovincial Championship
2006 in Gaelic football
GAA Interprovincial Championship
2006 in Northern Ireland sport